Adam Goldworm (born April 1, 1978) is a literary and talent manager at Aperture Entertainment, a boutique management/production company that he founded in March 2009.

Biography

Adam Goldworm is a film/TV/Theater producer.

His company Aperture Entertainment produced several films including  Summit Entertainment's horror action film The Last Witch Hunter starring Vin Diesel, Michael Caine, Rose Leslie and Elijah Wood with Breck Eisner (The Crazies) directing a script written by Cory Goodman, Vice written by his clients Jeremy Passmore & Andre Fabrizio and starring Bruce Willis, and The Prince also written by Passmore & Fabrizio and starring Bruce Willis, Jason Patric, John Cusack, 50 Cent and his client Jessica Lowndes. Goldworm is also producing Warner Bros.'s supernatural action film Lore written by his clients Cory Goodman & Jeremy Lott based on Ashley Wood's IDW graphic novel Lore starring Dwayne "The Rock" Johnson and directed by Men in Blacks Barry Sonnenfeld, MGM's remake of David Cronenberg's body horror classic The Brood and a new untitled thriller for Dimension that centers around the horrors of social networking.

Goldworm is also currently producing Nemesis: The Final Case of Elliot Ness, an 8-part miniseries written by his client Ben Brand based on the novel by William Bernhardt, Haunted at ABC with Jon Turteltaub (National Treasure) directing and the comedy series Saint James St. James Presents Delirium Cinema at IFC. Goldworm has also developed and produced several film projects including Simon Rumley's Red White & Blue, Luckytown starring Kirsten Dunst and James Caan and the low-budget zombie film Automaton Transfusion.

Goldworm reteamed with his former Masters of Horror crony Stuart Gordon to produce a horror stage play entitled  Taste, Written by Aperture Entertainment client Benjamin Brand, Taste is based on the true story of Armin Meiwes, aka the Rotenburg Cannibal, a German who achieved international notoriety for killing and eating a voluntary victim whom he had found via the Internet.  The play premiered in Los Angeles on April 11, 2014.  The initial production was nominated for numerous awards by all of LA's most prestigious critical associations.   The play is currently gearing up for its Chicago premiere in Spring 2016.

Goldworm spent five years at Industry Entertainment, ultimately serving as Executive Vice President, Television and playing an instrumental role in creating and overseeing the company's independent television division. Goldworm produced several high-profile television anthology series including Showtime's Masters of Horror, ABC's Masters of Science Fiction and NBC's summer series Fear Itself and developed a crime anthology with Chris McQuarrie and a 2012 miniseries with Bryan Singer and Michael Petroni for SyFy. Goldworm also oversaw the creation of the two Masters of Horror soundtracks released by Immortal Records and Downtown Records in addition to the IDW Publishing comic book line.

At the age of 31, Goldworm was one of the 35 executives under the age of 35 selected for The Hollywood Reporter'''s Next Generation 2008.

Goldworm was born in Philadelphia, Pennsylvania. He grew up in Cherry Hill, New Jersey and graduated from Cherry Hill High School East. He graduated cum laude from UCLA School of Theater, Film and Television in 1998 and received an MBA from UC Berkeley's Haas School of Business in 2003.  While at UC Berkeley, Goldworm taught Film to undergraduates.  Goldworm has written several news stories for Variety and Daily Variety where he started as an intern compiling charts focusing on the use of music in the film industry and writing obituaries.

Partial filmography as producerLuckytown (2001)Masters of Horror (2005–2006)Automaton Transfusion (2006)Masters of Science Fiction (2007)Fear Itself (2008)Red White & Blue (2010)Silent Night (2012)Haunted (2012)The Prince (2014)Vice (2014)Jackass of All Trades (2014)Taste (2015)The Last Witch Hunter (2015)Lore (2015)Man At Arms (2015)The Brood (2015)Apocalypse: Undead (2015)My Friend Dahmer (2015)Snuff (2015)The Factory Series (2015)Nemesis: The Final Case of Eliot Ness (2015)

See alsoMasters of HorrorFear Itself''

References

External links
 
 Variety article: Small Press Thinks Big by Adam Goldworm
 Variety article: Suber, Guber teach wanna-be producers by Adam Goldworm
 Hollywood Reporter: Next Gen 2008

1978 births
People from Cherry Hill, New Jersey
Cherry Hill High School East alumni
Living people
Film producers from New Jersey
Haas School of Business alumni
UCLA Film School alumni